EGOWS (European Working Group on Operational [Meteorological] Workstations) is a collaboration forum for European NMS (National Meteorological Services) in the field of workstations for duty forecasters. A three or four-day meeting is held every year, since 1990. Despite its name through time, EGOWS has also included non-European members.

EGOWS Virtual Meetings
At the 2019 EGOWS meeting, it was decided to supplement the annual meetings with a series of virtual meetings in order to have more frequent discussions with no travel cost.
1st Virtual EGOWS on Exchange of Time Series Data hosted by ECMWF, UK, 26 February 2020

EGOWS Annual Meetings 1990–
 30th EGOWS in De Bilt at KNMI, Netherlands, 12-14 Nov 2019
 29th EGOWS in Reading at ECMWF, UK, 15–17 October 2018
 28th EGOWS in Bratislava at SHMU, Slovakia, 30 May - 1 June 2017
 27th EGOWS in Helsinki at FMI, Finland, 20–22 September 2016
 26th EGOWS in Reading at ECMWF, UK, 29 Sep - 1 Oct 2015
 25th EGOWS in Oslo, Norway, June 2–5, 2014
  24th EGOWS in Offenbach am Main, Germany, June 11–13, 2013 
 23rd EGOWS in Exeter, United Kingdom 2012
 22nd EGOWS in Toulouse, France 2011
 21st EGOWS in Reading, UK 2010
 20th EGOWS in De Bilt, Netherlands 2009
 19th EGOWS in Ljubljana, Slovenia 2008
 18th EGOWS in Dublin, Ireland 2007
 17th EGOWS in Budapest, Hungary 2006
 16th EGOWS in Exeter, United Kingdom 2005
 15th EGOWS in Potsdam, Germany 2004
 14th EGOWS  in Tromsø, Norway 2003 pdf, 59,4 Mb
 13th EGOWS in Rome, Italy 2002
 12th EGOWS in Zürich, Switzerland 2001 pdf, 17.9 mb
 11th EGOWS in Helsinki, Finland 2000 pdf, 10.9 mb
 10th EGOWS in De Bilt, Netherlands 1999 pdf, 14.3 mb
 9th EGOWS in Norrköping, Sweden 1998 pdf, 13.5 mb
 8th EGOWS in Toulouse, France 1997 pdf, 12.0 mb
 7th EGOWS  in Reading, United Kingdom 1996	pdf, 6.6 mb
 6th EGOWS  in Vienna, Austria 1995	pdf, 10.8 mb
 5th EGOWS in Copenhagen, Denmark 1994 pdf, 3.8 mb
 4th EGOWS in Offenbach, Germany 1993 pdf, 3.7 mb
 3rd EGOWS in Helsinki, Finland 1992 pdf, 2.8 mb
 2nd EGOWS in Paris, France 1991 pdf, 2.1 mb
 1st EGOWS in Oslo, Norway 1990 pdf, 0.8 mb

Governmental meteorological agencies in Europe
Graphic software in meteorology